L&T fast interceptor craft are a series of high-speed interceptor boats being built by L&T Shipyard for the Indian Coast Guard. The ships are intended for patrol and rescue operations in India's Exclusive Economic Zone.

Design
The interceptor boats are of planing-type, designed by the L&T Marine & Ship Design Division, an in-house facility of  Larsen & Toubro Limited. They are 30 metres long with 90 tonnes displacement and can achieve a maximum speed of 45 knots. The interceptor boats has full aluminum-alloy hull for reduced weight and is powered by twin water-jet propulsion systems to enable quick response. The vessels are fitted with state-of-the-art navigation and communication equipment and medium-range armament. Each vessel is powered by two Caterpillar Marine Power Systems 3516C marine propulsion engines (2525 bkW @ 1800 rpm, ‘D’ Rating) and two C-4.4 auxiliary generator sets (86 eKW @ 1500 rpm). The water-jets for the high-speed interceptor boats are being supplied by MJP Waterjets. Delivery of the water-jets began in 2010 and will continue until 2013. They are also fitted with MARIS ECDIS900 SmartLine Mk10 Flat Panel Computer with radar kit.

The vessel's crew consists of one officer and eleven personnel and are designed to perform coastal surveillance, search and rescue, anti-smuggling and anti-poaching operations in close coast and can also operate effectively in shallow water.

Orders
M/s L&T secured an order on 22 March 2010 for building 36 high speed interceptor boats for Rs 977 crores. It further secured an additional order on 22 January 2013 to produce 18 similar Interceptor boats for Rs 447 crore. The boats were constructed at L&T's existing shipyard at Hazira and at  Kattupalli Shipyard near Ennore.

Commission and deployment
ICGS C-401, the first of the series was commissioned at Porbandar by Air Marshal A.K. Gogoi, Air Officer, Commanding-in-Chief South Western Air Command on 20 December 2012. Its first deployment is at Mundra under the administrative and operational control of the Commander Coast Guard (North-West) region and commanded by Deputy Commandant Lakshya Sharma.

The second vessel of the class, C-402, was commissioned at Mumbai Naval Dockyard on 12 April 2013, followed by C-403 at Mundra on 11 August 2013, and C-404 at Beypore on 6 December 2013. The ICGS C-421 was commissioned on 21 September 2015 at Androth (L&M Islands) commanded by Deputy Commandant Rohit Kulkarni. The ICGS C-422 was commissioned at the Karaikal Port on 28 November. The vessel will patrol the coastal areas of Tamil Nadu, along the Bay of Bengal. C-405 was donated to the Seychelles Coast Guard in February 2016 and recommissioned as SCGS Hermes.

On 29 July 2019, the government of India donated two vessels of the class to Mozambique Navy.

All 36 boats ordered in the first batch were commissioned by January 2020.

Ships of Class

See also
ABG fast interceptor craft

References

Patrol boat classes
Auxiliary search and rescue ship classes
Fast attack craft of the Indian Coast Guard
Ships of the Indian Coast Guard